Grue may refer to:

People
 A pen name used by cartoonist Johnny Gruelle
 Grue (surname), notable people with the surname Grue

Places
 Grue, Norway, a municipality in Innlandet county
 Isle-aux-Grues, an island in Quebec, Canada
 Grues, Vendée, a commune in France
 Grue (river), a river in north-west Italy

In fiction
 Grue (monster), a fictional predatory creature invented by American author Jack Vance and featured in the Zork series of interactive fiction computer games
 Grue (Freedom City), an alien race in the role-playing game Mutants and Masterminds
 Grue/Brian Laborn, a supervillain in the web novel Worm

Other
 Grue and bleen, portmanteau words formed from green and blue, coined by Nelson Goodman to illustrate his new riddle of induction
 Grue, a linguistic and translation concept (see Blue–green distinction in language)
 Crane (bird), a bird from the Grue family
 Grue, an influential science fiction fanzine published by Dean Grennell
 An early form of Nutraloaf, a food served in prison, known as "grue" to prisoners in the Arkansas penal system as described in the 1978 Hutto v. Finney decision

See also
 GRU (disambiguation)
 Groo (disambiguation)
 Grew
 Grewe